Gwendolen Mary Fitzalan-Howard, Duchess of Norfolk, 12th Lady Herries of Terregles (née Constable-Maxwell; 11 January 1877 – 28 August 1945) was the eldest child of Marmaduke Constable-Maxwell, 11th Lord Herries of Terregles and his wife, Angela (née Fitzalan-Howard). On 15 February 1904, she married her first cousin once removed, Henry Fitzalan-Howard, 15th Duke of Norfolk. The couple later had four children:
 Lady (Mary) Rachel Fitzalan-Howard (1905–1992)
 Bernard Marmaduke Fitzalan-Howard, 16th Duke of Norfolk (1908–1975)
 Lady Katherine Mary Fitzalan-Howard (1912–2000)
 Lady Winifred Alice Fitzalan-Howard (1914–2006)

Upon the death of her father in 1908, she, as the eldest child and daughter, inherited the Lordship Herries of Terregles. She died at her home Kinharvie House near New Abbey. A Requiem Mass was said at St Mary's in New Abbey before interment in the Norfolk burial vault at Arundel Castle in Sussex.

References

Sources

1877 births
1945 deaths
Gwendolen
Hereditary women peers
Lords Herries of Terregles
Gwendolen
Gwendolen
Wives of knights